Hot Shot is the fifth studio album released by Jamaican-American singer Shaggy. The album was first released on 8 August 2000, in the United States, before being issued in the United Kingdom on 9 October 2000, with a revised track listing. The revised UK edition was also released in Europe, but without the song "Why You Mad at Me?". The album was reissued in the UK on 26 March 2001.  Hot Shot went on to be certified six times platinum in the United States by the RIAA, and was the second best-selling album of 2001 in that country (behind Linkin Park's Hybrid Theory). The album has sold over nine million copies worldwide. A remix album, entitled Hot Shot Ultramix, was released in June 2002. Four singles were released from the album: "It Wasn't Me", "Angel", "Luv Me, Luv Me" and the double A-side single "Dance & Shout / Hope".

Hot Shot was the second highest-charting studio album of 2001 on the Billboard Year-End chart; it was also the best-selling album of 2001 in Canada.

Track listing
 "Hot Shot" – 3:47
 "Lonely Lover"  – 3:46
 "Dance & Shout"  – 3:47
 "Leave It to Me" – 3:37
 "Angel"  – 3:55
 "Hope"  – 3:47
 "Keep'n It Real" – 3:55
 "Luv Me, Luv Me"  – 3:36
 "Freaky Girl"  – 3:44
 "It Wasn't Me"  – 3:47
 "Not Fair"  – 3:47
 "Hey Love" – 4:01
 "Why Me Lord?" – 3:34
 "Chica Bonita"  – 4:01
 "Dance & Shout" (video)

Special UK edition
 "Hot Shot" – 3:49
 "Lonely Lover"  – 3:46
 "It Wasn't Me"  – 3:47
 "Freaky Girl"  – 3:44
 "Leave It to Me" – 3:37
 "Angel"  – 3:55
 "Hope"  – 3:47
 "Keep'n It Real" – 3:55
 "Luv Me, Luv Me"  – 3:36
 "Not Fair"  – 3:47
 "Hey Love" – 4:01
 "Why Me Lord?" – 3:34
 "Joy You Bring"  – 3:28
 "Chica Bonita"  – 4:01
 "Dance & Shout" (Dancehall Version)  – 4:27
 "Why You Mad at Me?" – 3:12
 "Dance & Shout" 
 "It Wasn't Me" 

Hot Shot Ultramix
 "It Wasn't Me" (Punch Mix) – 3:55
 "Special Request" – 3:33
 "Freaky Girl" (Strip Mix) – 3:48
 "Too Hot to Handle" – 4:57
 "Why You Mad at Me?" – 3:12
 "Keep'n It Real" (Swingers Mix) – 3:32
 "Leave It to Me" (Early Mix) – 4:01
 "Chica Bonita" (Player's Mix) – 4:09
 "It Wasn't Me" (The Cartel Mix) – 3:45
 "Dance & Shout" (Dancehall Version) – 4:27
 "Hope" (Dukes Mix) – 4:03
 "Angel" (live version) – 5:31
 "Dance & Shout" (Klub Kings Radio Edit) – 3:34

Charts

Weekly charts

Year-end charts

Certifications and sales

References

2000 albums
Shaggy (musician) albums
MCA Records albums
Reggae fusion albums
Juno Award for International Album of the Year albums